
The following are lists of Warner Bros. films by decade:
Note: This list does not include direct-to-video releases or films from New Line Cinema prior to its merger with Warner Bros. in 2008, nor does it include third-party films or films Warner gained the rights to as a result of mergers or acquisitions such as Metro-Goldwyn-Mayer's pre-May 1986 library or RKO Radio Pictures' library.

Lists 
List of Warner Bros. films (1918–1929)
List of Warner Bros. films (1930–1939)
List of Warner Bros. films (1940–1949)
List of Warner Bros. films (1950–1959)
List of Warner Bros. films (1960–1969)
List of Warner Bros. films (1970–1979)
List of Warner Bros. films (1980–1989)
List of Warner Bros. films (1990–1999)
List of Warner Bros. films (2000–2009)
List of Warner Bros. films (2010–2019)
List of Warner Bros. films (2020–2029)

 
Warner Bros. Discovery-related lists
Lists of films by studio
American films by studio